Peter Walsh (born 1956) is an Australian-American professional organizer, writer, and media personality. He became an American citizen in 2002, and has dual citizenship. He lives in Los Angeles.

Early life and career
Walsh was born in rural Victoria, Australia. He was educated at Salesian College, Rupertswood.  He holds a master's degree with a specialty in educational psychology. Upon graduation from university he taught high school math, science, and graphic art. He also worked in drug abuse prevention and health promotion, and in developing health, education, and training programs for schools and corporations.

He moved to Los Angeles in 1994, to launch a corporation to help organizations improve employees' job satisfaction and effectiveness. His clients have included numerous Fortune 500 companies as well as private individuals, and he has been president and CEO of an international training and development company.

Career as professional organizer

Television and radio
In 2003 Walsh's skills caught the eye of the producers of the TLC show Clean Sweep, and he became a professional organizer appearing on more than 120 episodes from 2003–2005, helping people declutter and organize their homes and lives. He was then a regular on The Oprah Winfrey Show in the late 2000s. In 2011, he premiered his own show, Enough Already! with Peter Walsh, which aired on OWN: The Oprah Winfrey Network. He has also appeared on the Nate Berkus Show, and beginning in 2013 he is a regular on the Rachael Ray show. He also had a weekly radio show, The Peter Walsh Show, on the Oprah Radio station on Sirius XM.
On his regular trips back to Australia, he makes appearances on Channel Ten's The Living Room, helping people declutter their lives. He also makes appearances on other Australian network TV shows, and on radio.

Books
Walsh has written several books on organization and de-cluttering. These include: How to Organize (Just About) Everything (2004); It's All Too Much (2006); Does This Clutter Make My Butt Look Fat? (2008); It's All Too Much Workbook (2009); and Enough Already! (2009). It's All Too Much is also on DVD.

He has also partnered with OfficeMax in developing several organization systems. He is also a spokesman for California Closets.

Personal life
Walsh has stated he is a very private person. However, in response Proposition 8, he was motivated in 2009 to speak on his weekly radio show about his U.S. citizenship, his being gay, and his June 2008 marriage to his partner.

References

External links 
 Peter Walsh – Official website
 

20th-century Australian businesspeople
American businesspeople
American television personalities
Australian non-fiction writers
Living people
1956 births
People educated at Salesian College (Rupertswood)
Australian emigrants to the United States
Australian LGBT writers
People from Victoria (Australia)